Grand Street was a railroad station on the Main Line of the Long Island Rail Road. It stood on Grand Street (now Avenue) in the Elmhurst section of Queens, New York City, west of the present Grand Avenue – Newtown subway station on the IND Queens Boulevard Line. Though it was only operational for 12 years, it served both the Main Line and the Rockaway Beach Branch which broke away from the main line in Rego Park.

The station opened as a pair of sheltered sheds on July 1, 1913, and served both local main line trains and as the original terminus of the Rockaway Beach Branch. The sheds were removed in 1922, and it was discontinued as a station stop in 1925. Three years later a new Rego Park Station was built on Whitepot Junction, but it served Rockaway Beach Branch trains exclusively.

References

External links
Ron Ziel historic photograph of Grand Street Station (LIRR Unofficial History Website)
Grand Street Station (Arrt's Arrchives)

Grand Street, Main
Elmhurst, Queens
Railway stations in Queens, New York
Railway stations in the United States opened in 1913
Railway stations closed in 1925
1925 disestablishments in New York (state)
1913 establishments in New York City
Grand Street and Grand Avenue